Flea Valley (also, Flea Valley House) is a former settlement and mining camp in Butte County, California. It was located northeast of Magalia, at an elevation of 3684 feet (1123 m).  Flea Valley still appeared on USGS maps as of 1897.

References

Former settlements in Butte County, California
Former populated places in California